Stoneholm is a historic house in Sharon, Massachusetts.  The -story stone house was built c. 1848, and is a distinctive Victorian house, exhibiting Second Empire and Italianate details executed in granite from the local Moyles Quarry near Borderland State Park.  Built for Horace Augustus Lothrop. The house has a mansard roof with flared eaves, with a rooftop deck and cupola.  The main facade is divided into three bays, with the entry in the central bay, sheltered by a wraparound single-story porch.  The center bay on the second level has a pair of round-arch windows, a feature echoed in the roof dormer directly above.

The house was listed on the National Register of Historic Places in 1980.

See also
National Register of Historic Places listings in Norfolk County, Massachusetts

References

Houses in Norfolk County, Massachusetts
Sharon, Massachusetts
Houses on the National Register of Historic Places in Norfolk County, Massachusetts